The 1906 Missouri Tigers football team was an American football team that represented the University of Missouri as an independent during the 1906 college football season. The team compiled a 5–2–1 record and outscored its opponents by a combined total of 94 to 79. W. J. Monilaw was the head coach for the first of three seasons. The team played its home games at Rollins Field in Columbia, Missouri.

Schedule

References

Missouri
Missouri Tigers football seasons
Missouri Tigers football